Japanese mon can refer to:
 Japanese mon (currency) (文), used in Japan until 1870.
 Mon (emblem) (紋), Japanese family heraldic symbols
 The Gate (novel) or  Mon, a 1910 novel by Natsume Sōseki
 Mon (architecture), one of the gates of a Buddhist temple or Shinto shrine in Japan

See also
 Mon 
 文 (disambiguation)